Tanja Žakelj (born 15 September 1988) is a Slovenian racing cyclist, holder of multiple world- and European champion titles. She was born in Kranj. She competed in mountain biking at the 2012 Summer Olympics in London and the 2016 Summer Olympics in Rio de Janeiro. She is the current (2013) European Champion and overall World Cup Winner. She was on the start list of 2018 Cross Country European Championships and finished 12. .

Most notable achievements:
Olympic games:
10th place, London 2012
13th place, Rio de Janeiro, 2016
World Championship:
1st place, junior, Rotoura 2006 
1st place, under 23, Val di Sole 2008 
3rd place, junior, Livigno 2005
4th place, Hafjell 2014  
4th place, under 23, Mont St. Anne 2010 
5th place, Pietermaritzburg 2013
European Championship: 
1st place, Bern 2013 
1st place, St. Wendel 2014 
1st place, junior, Chies D'Alpago 2006 
2nd place, under 23, St. Wendel 2008 
3rd place, under 23, Haifa 2010 
3rd place, Dohnany 2011
World Cup:
1st place, Val di Sole 2013 
1st place, Nove Mesto 2013 
1st place, under 23, Windham 2010
2nd place, Windham 2014  
2nd place, under 23, Houffalize 2010 
3rd place, Mont Sainte Anne 2013
4th place, Albstadt 2014
4th place, Albstadt 2013
5th place, Cairns 2014
5th place, Andorra 2013
6th place, Windham 2015
6th place, Mont St. Anne 2014 
6th place, Hofjell 2013
7th place, Mont-Sainte-Anne 2016
8ht place, Andorra 2016
9th place, Mont-Sainte-Anne 2015 
9th place, Offenburg 2011 
9th place, Mont St. Anne 2011 
10th place, Windham 2010
overall World Cup Winner 2013

References

External links
 
 Official website of Tanja Žakelj 

mtbcrosscountry.com - Tanja Zakelj profile 

1988 births
Living people
Sportspeople from Kranj
Slovenian female cyclists
Olympic cyclists of Slovenia
Cyclists at the 2012 Summer Olympics
Cyclists at the 2016 Summer Olympics
Cross-country mountain bikers
Cyclists at the 2020 Summer Olympics